The Tabula Bantina (Latin for "Tablet from Bantia") is a bronze tablet and one of the major sources for ancient Oscan, an extinct Indo-European language closely related to Latin. It was discovered in 1790 near Banzi (known as "Bantia" in antiquity), in the Italian region of Basilicata. It now may be found in the Naples Archaeological Museum.

Discovery

The tablet was found in 1790 on the hill Monte Montrone, in the territory of Oppido Lucano (province of Potenza), among the finds from an ancient tomb. It consists of a sheet of bronze in three larger pieces and some smaller fragments. It likely dates between 150 and 100 BCE and is inscribed on both sides.

Contents

On one side of the tablet is inscribed a municipal law from the city of Bantia, written in Oscan with Latin characters and 33 lines long, as it is preserved. On the other side is written a Roman plebiscite in Latin. The Latin text may have been the original one, and the tablet later re-used for the Oscan inscription.

The Oscan text probably dates from around 89 BC but whether it was written before or after the Social War (War of the Allies) is disputed.

From the Text

First paragraph out of six paragraphs, lines 3-8 (the first couple lines are too damaged to be clearly legible):

In Latin: 

In English: 

Notes: Oscan carn- "part, piece" is related to Latin carn- "meat" (seen in English 'carnivore'), from an Indo-European root *ker- meaning 'cut'--apparently the Latin word originally meant 'piece (of meat).' Oscan tangin- "judgement, assent" is ultimately related to English 'think'.

Second paragraph = lines 8-11:

In Latin:

In English:

References

Osco-Umbrian languages
Inscriptions